Tilingia is a plant genus belonging to the family Apiaceae. The genus was named in 1859 by Heinrich Sylvester Theodor Tiling and Eduard August von Regel.

Species
, Plants of the World Online accepted two species:
Tilingia ajanensis Regel & Tiling
Tilingia holopetala (Maxim.) Kitag.

References

External links

Apioideae
Apioideae genera